Beachborough is a hamlet WNW of Folkestone in Kent, England. It lies south of Etchinghill on a minor cross-country route. At the 2011 Census the population of the hamlet was included in the civil parish of Newington.

The hamlet forms a part of Beachborough Manor, which became a small landed estate.  Brockman and Drake-Brockman families, then by other families, among whom were briefly the Markham (baronets)Markham baronets, who used Beachborough as their territorial affiliation, when awarded their title in 1911.

Hamlets in Kent
Folkestone and Hythe District